David Cooke may refer to:

Politics
 Dave Cooke (born 1952), Canadian NDP politician from Windsor, Ontario
 David R. Cooke (born 1937), Canadian Liberal politician in Ontario
 David O. Cooke (1920–2002), former U.S. Department of Defense administrator
 David Cooke (mayor) on List of mayors of Ballarat

Sports
 David Cooke (basketball) (born 1963), American basketball player
 David A. Cooke (born 1949), English rugby union player
 David H. Cooke (born 1955), English rugby union player

Others
 Dave Cooke (businessman) (born 1950s), founder of charities Operation Christmas Child and Teams4U
 David Cooke (Royal Navy officer) (1955–2014), British admiral
 David Cooke (BBFC), succeeded Robin Duval at British Board of Film Classification
 David Cooke (voice actor), voiced as Morton Koopa Jr since Mario Kart 8
 David Cooke, a video game programmer who worked for Tarantula Studios

See also
 David Cook (disambiguation)
 David Coke (pronounced Cook, 1915–1941), British pilot